Chamber Singers may refer to:
a choir
H-B Woodlawn Chamber Singers